The Star Tavern is a Grade II listed public house at 6 Belgrave Mews West, Belgravia, London SW1.

It was built in the early to mid-19th century.

It was listed as one of Business Insider's best pubs in London.

It has been listed in every edition of CAMRA's Good Beer Guide since 1974, one of only five pubs to achieve this.

References

External links
 

Buildings and structures completed in the 19th century
Belgravia
19th-century architecture in the United Kingdom
Grade II listed pubs in the City of Westminster
Fuller's pubs